Davide Mengacci (born 8 September 1948, in Milan) is an Italian television host who has been working in television since 1986. From 2000 to 2005 he worked on the show La domenica del villaggio with Mara Carfagna, who in May 2008 was appointed Minister for Equal Opportunity in the fourth cabinet of Prime Minister Silvio Berlusconi. Mengacci is also a photographer, and has written the book Viva gli Sposi ("Long Live the Newlyweds", 1992).

Career
Otto Italie allo specchio (1986)
Pentathlon (1987)
Questioni di stile (1988)
Candid camera show (1988–90)
Scene da un matrimonio (1990-6)
Il pranzo è servito (1992-3)
Perdonami (1993-6)
La domenica del villaggio (1996-2005)
Fornelli d'Italia (1999-2004)
In cucina con Mengacci (2011)

External links
Home page

1948 births
Mass media people from Milan
Italian television personalities
Living people